The Concerto in F Minor for Bass Tuba and Orchestra by British composer Ralph Vaughan Williams was written in 1954 for Philip Catelinet, principal tubist of the London Symphony Orchestra (LSO), who together gave the premiere on 13 June 1954 with Sir John Barbirolli conducting. The same musicians made the work’s first recording that same year. This concerto was the first concerto written for solo tuba.

Composition and history
While at first viewed as the eccentric idea of an aging composer, the concerto soon became one of Vaughan Williams' most popular works, and an essential part of the tuba repertoire.

The work is in three movements:
Prelude: Allegro moderato
Romanza: Andante sostenuto
Finale - Rondo alla tedesca: Allegro

A performance commonly takes about 13 minutes. Apart from the solo tuba, the piece is scored for two flutes (2nd doubling on piccolo), oboe, 2 clarinets (in B♭), bassoon, 2 horns (in F), 2 trumpets (in B♭), 2 trombones, timpani, triangle, side drum, bass drum, cymbals, and strings.

Recordings
Vaughan Williams' concerto has since received a number of concert performances and recordings.  Live performances include those by Gerard Hoffnung, James Gourlay, Michael Lind,  and Peter Whish-Wilson.  In addition to Catelinet's pioneering recording, other recordings of the concerto have featured the following artists:
 RCA: John Fletcher; London Symphony Orchestra, André Previn, conductor
 Hungarian Radio: Vilmos Szabó Principal Tuba, Budapest Symphony Orchestra, Nóra Schmidt piano (1980)
 Chandos: Patrick Harrild; London Symphony Orchestra, Bryden Thomson, conductor
 Deutsche Grammophon: Arnold Jacobs; Chicago Symphony Orchestra, Daniel Barenboim, conductor
 Naxos: James Gourlay; Royal Ballet Sinfonia, Gavin Sutherland, conductor
 Capriccio:  Richard Nahatzki; Berlin Symphony Orchestra, Hans E. Zimmer, conductor
 Caprice: Michael Lind ; Stockholm Radio Symphony Orchestra, Leif Segerstam, conductor
 BIS: Øystein Baadsvik; Singapore Symphony Orchestra, Anne Manson, conductor
 David Unland; Cornell University Wind Ensemble
 Walter Hilgers; Frankfurt Symphony Orchestra
 Beth Mitchell; Pasadena City College and Biola University

References

Concertos by Ralph Vaughan Williams
1954 compositions
Vaughan Williams, Ralph